Vilonia School District  is a public school district based in Vilonia, Arkansas. It was originally established as Oak Grove School District. The district encompasses  of land in Faulkner County and serves the all or portions of the communities of Vilonia, Conway, Cabot, and Mount Vernon.

Schools
 Vilonia High School (Current Configuration 1970s–present), serving grades 10 through 12.
 Vilonia Freshman Academy (Current Configuration 2015-Present, formerly Vilonia Junior High, served grades  and 9), serving grade 9.
 Vilonia Middle School (Current Configuration 2015–present), serving grades 7 and 8. 
 Frank Mitchell Intermediate School (Current Configuration 2015–present), new school serving grades 4 through 6.
 Vilonia Elementary School (Current Configuration 2015–present), serving kindergarten through grade 3. (1980s–2006) 
 Vilonia Primary School (Current Configuration 2015–present), serving kindergarten through grade 3. 
 Vilonia Early Childhood Learning Center, serving pre-kindergarten.

References

External links
 

Education in Faulkner County, Arkansas
School districts in Arkansas